Jane Smiley (born September 26, 1949) is an American novelist. She won the Pulitzer Prize for Fiction in 1992 for her novel A Thousand Acres (1991).

Biography
Born in Los Angeles, California, Smiley grew up in Webster Groves, Missouri, a suburb of St. Louis, and  graduated from Community School and from John Burroughs School. She obtained a BA in literature at Vassar College (1971), then earned an MA (1975), MFA (1976), and PhD (1978) from the University of Iowa. While working toward her doctorate, she also spent a year studying in Iceland as a Fulbright Scholar. From 1981 to 1996 she was a Professor of English at Iowa State University, teaching undergraduate and graduate creative writing workshops. In 1996, she relocated to California. She returned to teaching creative writing at the University of California, Riverside, in 2015.

Career
Smiley published her first novel, Barn Blind, in 1980, and won a 1985 O. Henry Award for her short story "Lily", which was published in The Atlantic Monthly. Her best-selling A Thousand Acres, a story based on William Shakespeare's King Lear, received the Pulitzer Prize for Fiction in 1992. It was adapted into a film of the same title in 1997. Her novella The Age of Grief was made into the 2002 film The Secret Lives of Dentists. Her essay "Feminism Meets the Free Market" was included in the 2006 anthology Mommy Wars  by Washington Post writer Leslie Morgan Steiner. Her essay "Why Bother?" appears in the anthology Knitting Yarns: Writers on Knitting, published by W. W. Norton & Company in 2013.
Thirteen Ways of Looking at the Novel (2005), is a non-fiction meditation on the history and the nature of the novel, somewhat in the tradition of E. M. Forster's seminal Aspects of the Novel, that roams from eleventh century Japan's Murasaki Shikibu's The Tale of Genji to 21st-century American women's literature.

In 2001, Smiley was elected a member of The American Academy of Arts and Letters. She has participated in the annual Los Angeles Times Festival of Books, the Cheltenham Festival, the National Book Festival, the Hay Festival of Literature and the Arts, and many others. She won the PEN USA Lifetime Achievement Award in 2006, and chaired the judges' panel for the prestigious Man Booker International Prize in 2009.

Jonathan Franzen, author of The Corrections (2001), considers Smiley's book The Greenlanders to be greatly underappreciated and among the best works of contemporary American fiction.

Smiley's then wrote a trilogy of novels about an Iowa family over the course of generations. The first novel of the trilogy, Some Luck, was published in 2014 by Random House. The second volume followed in the spring of 2015, and the third volume in the fall of 2015.

Awards
Smiley received the Pulitzer Prize for Fiction in 1992. In 2006, she received the  Fitzgerald Award for Achievement in American Literature award which is given annually in Rockville, Maryland, the city where Fitzgerald, his wife, and his daughter are buried, as part of the F. Scott Fitzgerald Literary Festival.

Works

Novels
Barn Blind (1980)
At Paradise Gate (1981)
Duplicate Keys (1984)
The Greenlanders (1988)
A Thousand Acres (1991)
Moo (1995)
The All-True Travels and Adventures of Lidie Newton (1998)
Horse Heaven (2000)
Good Faith (2003)
Ten Days in the Hills (2007)
Private Life (2010)
Some Luck (2014)
Early Warning (April, 2015)
Golden Age (October 20, 2015)
Perestroika in Paris (2020)
A Dangerous Business (2022)

Short story collections
The Age of Grief (1987)
Ordinary Love & Good Will (1989)

Non-fiction books
Catskill Crafts (1988)
Charles Dickens (2003)
A Year at the Races: Reflections on Horses, Humans, Love, Money, and Luck (2004)
Thirteen Ways of Looking at the Novel (2005)
The Man Who Invented the Computer (2010)

Young adult novels
 The Georges and the Jewels (2009)
 A Good Horse (2010)
 True Blue (2011)
 Pie in the Sky (2012)
 Gee Whiz (2013)
 Riding Lessons (2018)
 Saddles and Secrets (2019)
 Taking the Reins (2020)

References

External links

 2004 Slate article: "The unteachable ignorance of the red states"
 Write TV Public Television Interview with Jane Smiley
 2003 interview of Jane Smiley, IdentityTheory
 'Jane Smiley's Good Faith', review of Good Faith in the Oxonian Review
 2010 Monterey Weekly article: "In her new novel, Private Life, the Pulitzer Prize-winning author uses family history as fictional fodder."
KCRW Bookworm Interview
 

20th-century American novelists
21st-century American novelists
American women novelists
American women short story writers
American literary critics
Women literary critics
Pulitzer Prize for Fiction winners
O. Henry Award winners
Members of the American Academy of Arts and Letters
Iowa State University faculty
People from Webster Groves, Missouri
Novelists from Missouri
1949 births
Living people
Vassar College alumni
University of Iowa alumni
Iowa Writers' Workshop faculty
Iowa Writers' Workshop alumni
20th-century American women writers
21st-century American women writers
Women mystery writers
20th-century American short story writers
21st-century American short story writers
Novelists from Iowa
American women non-fiction writers
20th-century American non-fiction writers
21st-century American non-fiction writers
American women academics
American women critics
Fulbright alumni